The  Iran Meteorological Organization, also called the Met Department, is an agency of the Ministry of Roads and Urban Development of the Government of Iran. Headquartered in Tehran, it is the principal agency responsible for meteorological observations, weather forecasting and seismology, operating hundreds of observation stations across Iran.

History
In 1928, the meteorological office was included in the Barzegaran school curriculum, taught by French teachers. The first platform for the measurement of meteorological data, air temperature, relative humidity and rainfall was built and completed in 1929 in the Barzegaran school. After World War II, the first meteorological observatories were established in Iran by the Allies in 1948.

Heads of Meteorological Organization
Before the revolution:

-Professor Mohammad Hassan Ganji from 1335 to 1347

- Abdolhossein Parviz Navai from 1347 to 1357

- Ginos Nemat (Supervisor of 1978)

- General Asghar Behsarsht (1978)

After the revolution :

- Cyrus Ahadpour from 1357 to 1358

- Hassan Hajilari from 1358 to 1359

- Kazem Samadian from 1359 to 1360

- Ali Mohammad Nourian from 1360 to 1372

- Hossein Ali Taravat from 1372 to 1373

- Ali Mohammad Nourian from 1373 to 1388 (second time)

-Bahram Sanaei from 1388 to 1392

- Davood Parhizgar from 1392 to 1397

- Sahar Tajbakhsh since March 1397

See also
 Atmospheric Science and Meteorological Research Center

References

Governmental meteorological agencies in Asia
Government agencies of Iran